Guatemalan Social Democratic Party was a political party in Guatemala.

History
The political party was registered in 2015 by Carlos Alfonso González Quezada. Guatemalan Social Democratic Party was suspended for not having the necessary affiliates. It was canceled in July 2018 for not having the necessary requirements for its validity.

References

External links

2015 establishments in Guatemala
2018 disestablishments in Guatemala
Centrist parties in North America
Defunct political parties in Guatemala
Political parties disestablished in 2018
Political parties established in 2015